Live in Europe is a live album from soul singer Otis Redding.  It was Redding's first live album as well as the only live album released during his lifetime, issued exactly five months before his death on December 10, 1967. The album was recorded during the Stax/Volt tour of Europe and Redding is backed by Booker T. & the MG's. Recorded at the Olympia Theatre, Paris; March 21, 1967.

The album is currently available on compact disc, digitally remastered by Bill Inglot and Dan Hersch as part of the Atlantic & Atco Remasters Series done on Rhino Records. Alternately, seven of its ten tracks appear as bonus tracks to the 2008 reissue of Otis Blue or the 2016 reissue of The Otis Redding Dictionary of Soul, also on Rhino.

Critical reception and legacy 
In a 1969 piece called "A Short and Happy History of Rock", published by Stereo Review, Robert Christgau selected Live in Europe as a representative Redding LP in his basic rock "library" of 25 albums. He went on to write of Redding and the album in the context of rock history:

However, Christgau's later appraisals of the album have ranged from it "captur[ing] a sensitive soul man at his toughest and most outgoing" to it being "among [Redding's] worst" due to "too many concessions to an English audience that wanted fast rock and roll songs".

In 2003, Live in Europe was ranked number 474 on Rolling Stone magazine's list of the 500 greatest albums of all time.

Track listing

Charts

Album

Singles

References

External links 
 Otis Redding - Stax Records

Otis Redding albums
1967 live albums
Atco Records live albums
Stax Records live albums
Albums produced by Jim Stewart (record producer)
Albums produced by Tom Dowd